Valère Guillet (1796 – February 26, 1881) was a notary and political figure in colonial Quebec. He represented Saint-Maurice in the Legislative Assembly of Lower Canada from 1830 to 1836 as a supporter of the Parti patriote.

He was born in Batiscan, Lower Canada, the son of Jean-Baptiste Guillet and Marguerite Langlois. He was educated at the Séminaire de Nicolet, studied law with his brother Louis and was admitted to practice as a notary in 1825. Guillet practiced in Saint-Pierre-les-Becquets, Yamachiche and Trois-Rivières. He supported the Ninety-Two Resolutions. Guillet was coroner for Trois-Rivières district from 1836 to 1878. From 1847 to 1862, he was secretary for the Chambre des notaires for Trois-Rivières and Saint-François districts; Guillet was president from 1862 to 1868. He died at Trois-Rivières at the age of 84.

His sister Marie married Alexis Rivard, another member of the legislative assembly.

References 

1796 births
1881 deaths
Members of the Legislative Assembly of Lower Canada
Canadian coroners